Research Video is a music footage library operating from North Hollywood, Los Angeles. The company was formed in 1984 by partners John Delgatto and Paul Surratt. Paul Surratt was also an ex-Shilos member, a folk group headed by Gram Parsons. John Delgatto left the company in March 1988 to return full time to his record label, Sierra Records.  Paul Surratt owns the rights to an extensive collection of television and film footage dating back to the 1950s. Surratt's company also performs video restoration serving clients that vary from Dinah Shore and Perry Como to ABC and NBC.

A storage space owned by Surrat burned down near the headquarters of Research Video in 2001. However, the company's main archives were not affected.

References

External links 
 {{Official website|http://www.researchvideo.com/}, has been offline since 2016}

Archives in the United States
Film archives in the United States
Companies based in Los Angeles
1984 establishments in California